Ceremonial dress is clothing worn for very special occasions, such as coronations, graduations, parades, religious rites, trials and other important events. In the western dress code hierarchy of dress codes, ceremonial dress is often considered one of the most formal, in other cultures ceremonial dresses vary widely having entirely different meanings, and styles.

Examples
There has been documented knowledge on the effects of ceremonial clothing, with those wearing ceremonial clothing have been used to denote a wide range of usage among varying unique cultures. Examples of ceremonial dress include:

 royal cloak (ermine lined), crown and scepter of a monarch
 court dress, such as the robe and wig worn by British judges
 diplomatic uniform
 the full dress uniforms of military personnel (or ceremonial suit of armour)
 religious clothing, such as liturgical vestments
 folk costume or tribal reserved for the most formal occasions
 academic dress
 Wedding clothing, including wedding dresses

See also
 Dress code
 Fashion
 Western dress codes
 Costume

References